The Human Rights Defender of Armenia is the official ombudsman, who, acting pursuant to the Constitution of Armenia, as well as, principles and norms of international law, protects the human rights and fundamental freedoms of individuals. The office of the Human Rights Defender was established in 2003 and has since became a member of the European Ombudsman Institute. The headquarters of the Human Rights Defender of Armenia are located in Yerevan. Since 24 January 2022, Kristinne Grigoryan was elected as the Human Rights Defender of Armenia by the National Assembly.

Background
The word "Ombudsman" has Swedish roots and the literal translation means "grievance person". This word in its modern meaning was first used by the Swedish parliament in the 19th century when establishing the office of the justitieombudsman. This office was responsible for defending citizens when they had issues with the government.

Human rights defenders operate all over the world. Independent of whether the state is stable or not due to internal conflicts, non-democratic or having strong democratic practice, economically developing or not, the defenders role in a country is always crucial. They seek to promote and protect human rights in the context of a variety of challenges, including societal development, migration, structural adjustment policies, and political transition.

History
The office of the Human Rights Defender of Armenia was founded in the beginning of 2004 through legislation signed by the former President of Armenia, Robert Kocharyan.

To be considered as a candidate for the position of Human Rights Defender of Armenia, one must meet the following criteria:
 	Be an Armenian citizen;
 	Have lived in Armenia for the past 5 years;
 	Minimum age of 25;
   Possess sufficient knowledge and experience in the defense of human rights field.

The National Assembly shall appoint the Defender by a vote of more than 3/5 of the general number of deputies from candidates nominated by the President of the Republic, 1/5 of the National Assembly deputies. He/she shall be appointed to office for a term of 6 years, with not more than two consecutive terms.

The Defender should take the following oath upon his/her appointment:

"Having accepted the commitments of human rights defender I hereby swear to be faithful to RA Constitution and laws, the principles of justice and civil society as to defend the human rights and fundamental freedoms of individuals. I swear to act in impartial, honest and diligent manner."

Human Rights Defenders' of Armenia
From the foundation of the Human Rights Defender's office, besides the Defender in Chief, Tigran Bazarchyan, Armenia has had 5 human rights defenders:

Larisa Alaverdyan was the first Human Rights Defender of Armenia, who was appointed by the decree of the president of Armenia Robert Kocharyan on 19 February 2004. Mrs. Alaverdyan began her duties on 1 March 2004. 
Armen Harutyunyan was the second Human Rights Defender of Armenia and first one who was appointed through elections by the National Assembly. He was elected obtaining more than 3/5 votes of deputies on 17 February 2006. Armen Harutyunyan assumed his responsibilities of the Human Rights Defender on 20 February 2006. He sent a statement for resignation to the National Assembly on 1 February 2011, as he assumed to take up the position of UN High Commissioner for Human Rights Representative in Central Asia.
Karen Andreasyan was the third Human Rights Defender in Armenia. On 2 March 2011, the National Assembly elected the new Ombudsman, with 83 parliamentarians voting for and 13 against. Karen Andreasyan assumed his responsibilities as Human Rights Defender of Armenia on 3 March 2011. 
Arman Tatoyan became the fourth ombudsman of Armenia. He was elected by the National Assembly in February 2016. Arman Tatoyan was the former deputy Minister of Justice.
Kristinne Grigoryan became the fifth Human Rights Defender on 24 January 2022.

Power and influential zones

Power
The Defender is independent in executing his/her powers and is guided only by the Constitution and the laws of the Republic of Armenia, as well as norms and principles of International Laws. The Defender is not subordinated to any central or local self-governing agency or official.
The Defender is not required to give explanations, including as a witness, about the essence of complaint or documents in their possession or provide them for familiarization, except in cases prescribed by law and order.
The decisions of the Defender are not administrative acts and cannot be appealed.
The Defender has the right to be present at the sittings of the Government of the Republic of Armenia and other state agencies, and make a speech if there are discussed issues regarding the human rights and the fundamental freedoms of people, as well as provide questions concerning the violation of the human rights or the fundamental freedoms by the agency where the sitting is taking place or the subordinate agencies or officials of that agency.
The Defender or his/her representative has the right to be present at the sittings of the National Assembly of the Republic of Armenia, make a speech ordered by the law of the Republic of Armenia “The Regulation of National Assembly of the Republic of Armenia” when there are discussed issues regarding the human rights and the fundamental freedoms of people.
The Defender or his/her representative has the right to unrestrictedly visit, by their own initiative, military units, police detention centers, pre-trial or serving their sentence in penitentiaries, as well as other places of corrective detention in order to receive complaints from the applicants which are kept in those places.
The conversations of the Defender or their representative with the people mentioned above are not subject for interference or being wiretapped. 
After making the decision regarding the adoption of the complaint the Defender is eligible to apply to appropriate state agencies or their officials to promote the investigation of the circumstances, which are subject of revelation. 
The investigation of the issues mentioned in the complaint cannot be done by the central or local self-governing agency or their officials which decisions or acts (idleness) are being appealed.
The Defender is eligible to: 
have free access to every state organization or institution, including the military units, prisons, inter alia preliminary detention facilities and penitentiaries;
require and receive necessary materials and documents regarding the complaint from every central or local self-governing agency or their officials;
receive clarifications regarding the issues arisen from the investigation of the complaint from the central or local self-governing agencies or their officials and public servants, except the Courts and judges:
instruct relevant state agencies to carry out expert examinations and prepare findings on the issues subject to clarification during investigation of the complaint;
familiarize with those criminal, civil, administrative, disciplinary, economic and other cases of violation of rights on which the respective Court verdicts and decisions have entered into legal force, as well as materials related to such cases on which no proceedings have been instituted; 
familiarize with every material and document regarding the complaint.
The officials of central and local self-governing agencies are obliged to provide every required material and document regarding their jurisdiction, as well as provide any information to the Defender necessary for the discussion of the complaint free of charge and without hindrance.
Within his/her jurisdiction the Defender enjoys the right of urgent reception of central and local self-governing agencies, their officials, as well as the heads of organizations and other officials, and coercive detention facilities.
While investigating the complaints the Defender is obliged to give an opportunity to those central or local self-governing agency or their official whose decision or acts (idleness) are being complained to make clarifications about the complaint and the results of investigation, as well as fully substantiate their position.
After the discussion in 10 days the results about the complaint are being given to those central or local self-governing agencies or their official whose decision or acts (idleness) are being complained. The mentioned is obliged to send his position and clarifications to the Defender no later than 15 days after receiving the results of investigation. This deadline can be extended by the Defender.

Who can apply and not discussable complaints
Any individual regardless of their nationality, citizenship, place of residence, sex, race, age, political and other views, and capabilities can appeal to the Defender.
Persons who are under arrest, in preliminary detention or serving their sentence in penitentiaries, as well as persons in other places of coercive detention also have the right to appeal to the Defender.
The Defender or their representative are guaranteed to have confidential, separate, unrestricted communication with persons in military units, under in preliminary detention or serving their sentence in penitentiaries, as well as persons in other places of coercive detention.
Conversations of the Defender or his representatives with persons mentioned in this paragraph are not a subject to any interference or eavesdropping.
Having appealed to the defender does not result in any administrative, criminal or other liability, nor in any discrimination towards the applicant.
Legal entities may also appeal to the Defender.
A complaint made on behalf of a legal entity relates to violation of human rights and fundamental freedoms, if the violation of the legal entity's rights entails violation of the rights and fundamental freedoms and legitimate interests of physical persons participants of the entity (shareholders, stockholders, members, etc.) and its officials, or the violation of the legal entity's rights has caused them damage or there exists the potential for damage.
Only representatives of a person or family members and devisees of deceased persons can appeal to the Defender with the purpose of protecting other persons' rights.
Central and local self-governing agencies, except for the agencies of trusteeship and guardianship, do not have the right to appeal to the Defender.
State officials shall have the right to appeal to the Defender only for the protection of their individual citizen rights (human rights) that have been violated.
The Defender sends the copy of the decision to the applicant as soon as possible, but no later than 30 days after receiving the complaint.
The Defender is eligible to start the discussion of the issue on their initiative, especially in those cases when there is information about the mass violation of the human rights and fundamental freedoms, or it has unique social meaning, or is related to necessity of defending such persons’ interests who are not able to use the legal means of their defense themselves.
The Defender does not discuss the complaints which have to be solved only by judicial order, as well as stops the discussion of the complaint if after starting the discussion the interested person submitted a claim or complaint to the Court.
The Defender is eligible not to discuss the anonymous complaints and those which were given after a year from the day when the applicant has known or should have known about the violation of their rights and freedom, as well as the complaints which, in the opinion of Defender, do not witness about violation of the human rights and fundamental freedoms or do not demand anything.
If in the complaint the issue by its nature can be solved by other state agency or official, and if that person did not discuss the given case previously, the Defender in agreement with the presenter of the complaint can hand the complaint to them, taking control over its discussion.
In this case, the applicant is being informed that the complaint is handed to another official.

After discussing the complaint
Based on the results of the discussion about the complaint the Defender must accept one of these decisions:
to recommend to the central or local self-governing agency or their official in whose decisions or acts (idleness) the Defender sees violation of human rights and fundamental freedoms to eliminate those violations by indicating the possible events which should recover the human rights and fundamental freedoms;
about the absence of violation of human rights and freedoms if during the discussion of the complaint a violation of human rights and fundamental freedoms by the central or local self-governing agency or its official is not revealed;
to stop the discussion of the complaint by the law if during the discussion of the complaint reasons are revealed regarding not to discussing the complaint or stopping the discussion of the complaint.
to bring an action before the court on invalidating in full or partially the normative legal acts of the central and local government agencies or officials that violate human rights, fundamental freedoms and lawful interests and contradict the law and other statutes, if the central or local government agencies or officials, who committed the named violation, do not invalidate in full or partially their corresponding legal act within the prescribed period;
to recommend that the authorized state agencies execute disciplinary or administrative penalties or file criminal charges against the official whose decisions or acts (idleness) violated human and civil rights and freedoms and (or) violated the requirements of this Law.

The state agencies after receiving the complaint
Central or local self-governing agencies or their official who received the Defender's motion in 20 days is obliged to inform to the Defender in written form about the undertaken events. The deadline can be extended in agreement with the Defender, if necessary.
If necessary, he Defender can present special reports to the President of the Republic of Armenia and to National Assembly.
The Defender can publish in mass media special information about the central or local self-governing agency or official who failed to respond to their motion or did not comply or only partly complied with the requirements of the motion, together with the responses of the central or local government agency or their officials to the decision of the Defender and motion if all other means of resolving the issue through state authorities have been exhausted.

Restrictions and limitations
The Human Rights Defender of Armenia shall be guided only by the Constitution and the Law of Armenia, as well as norms and principles of International Law.

By the law on Human Rights Defender signed by the president, the person who is elected as a Human Rights Defender shall not:

Hold any state or other office or perform other work for compensation, except for scientific, pedagogical or creative activities.
Be a member of any political party
Nominate his/her candidacy for elections
Participate in pre-election campaigns

Within 14 days after assuming Office, the Defender shall discontinue any activity that is inconsistent with these requirements.

The defender can not:

Intervene into judicial processes  (S/he may ask for information on any case that is on the stage of trial and direct recommendations/comments to the court, as to guarantee the rights of citizens to fair functioning of the court system as enshrined in the Constitution and norms of International Law)
Publish any personal data about the complainant or any other person that were disclosed during examination of the complaint without their written consent.

In addition, the Defender's decision cannot hinder the person from protecting his/her rights, freedoms and legal interests by other means not prohibited by law.

Defender's immunity
According to the law of the Human Rights Defender:

After assuming his/her responsibilities the defender cannot be prosecuted or hold liability because of the actions s/he did on his post, including the opinions expressed in National Assembly (if they are not offensive or defamatory). 
No criminal prosecution shall be brought against him/her; s/he cannot be detained or arrested without the consent of the National Assembly.  In case the Defender is caught in the act of crime, the official person executing the arrest shall immediately inform the President of the National Assembly about the fact.

Annual report
Every year, amid the first quarter of the year, the Defender should convey a report on his/her exercises and on the human rights circumstance in the earlier year to the President of Armenia and the agents of official, administrative, and legal powers. The reports should be exhibited to the National Assembly amid the first sitting of the National Assembly's spring session. The Defender likewise displays his/her answer to broad communications and important NGOs.

Termination
There are several acceptable grounds for termination, including:
The Defender's powers shall terminate 6 years after his/her oath.
In case of termination of the Defender's powers, the new Defender shall be appointed within a month from the date of termination of the powers of the previous Defender. 
The Defender's powers shall be terminated prior to the end of the term if:
A verdict of the Court convicting the Defender enters into legal force;
The Defender loses citizenship of the Republic of Armenia;
The Defender repeats his/her letter of resignation to National Assembly of Armenia not more than 10 days after first letter of resignation. 
The Defender is declared disabled, partly disabled, missing or deceased by an effective decision of the Court;
In case of Defender's death.

Notable cases

Ombudsman strongly condemns any case of violence against human rights activists
On the sixteenth of April with profound misgiving we gain from our Rapid Response group in Lori marz, that the human rights activists of Helsinki Citizens' Assembly Vanadzor Office had been assaulted.

As per the declaration of the Helsinki Citizens' Assembly Vanadzor Office  a few subjects, who were against screening of Azerbaijani movies, tossed stones towards the human rights association's office, ill-used, harmed the property and even hurt one of the officers.

Savagery towards any individual is unequivocally censured, and brutality towards persons with exceptional mission including human rights shields and writers is over and again denounced. Savagery towards human rights guards and writers is a wrongdoing, as well as disgrace and disgrace for the general public. It would be more disgraceful if such activities don't get a sufficient open response, and law authorization bodies don't completely secure human rights protectors and rebuff the liable with all the strictness of the law.

I am against screening of Azerbaijani movies in Armenia, particularly in the current circumstance, when Azerbaijani riflemen execute our siblings on the fringe, when Azerbaijan shows scorn towards us all over the place, specifically Azerbaijani President's late wild indication that stunned and disturbed numerous Europeans. 
We see ourselves as Europeans. Our goals are unequivocally situated towards Europe. Our Christian and national qualities have dependably driven us towards resilience and humanism. A genuine Christian, an accommodating Armenian, an advanced European can't express his difference by tossing stones. A law authorization body with a Christian philosophy, drove in its activities by sacred qualities and the letter of law, can't stay detached in such inadmissible case and shun brief uncovering and rebuffing the liable of the wrongdoing submitted.

RA Human Rights Defender Preliminary Observations on the Presidential Elections 2013
Dear Citizens,
 
Each election is always followed by certain results and various assessments. Above the actual election results much more important is the public's confidence in regards to those results.  Public's confidence can be formed only by neutral and objective assessments. From today on many local and international organizations will present their assessments on these elections.
 
Nonetheless, no rating can be full and reliable for the Armenian society, if the Armenian Police doesn't present objectively on how many calls related to the following serious electoral violations were and how many of them were valid:
 
Voting bribes,
Double voting,
Directed voting,
Ballot stuffing,
Committee member or proxy's pressure during the calculation of votes
Falsification of results of vote counting
 
Moreover, the Police should also publicize basis and reasons for considering those calls valid or invalid.
 
Also is essential to find out urgently and to inform the society on why the Gala TV website activities were disrupted during the Election Day. It's also crucial to find out all the cases of journalist and observers activity obstacles and to take to responsibility the guilty ones.
 
Not credible activity of the RA Police may obscure positive achievements of all the phases of these Elections. Hence, the RA Policy is responsible to carry the heavy burden of the public's reliability on the Elections results and of the Elections’ general assessment.  I urge all the institutions and individuals to cooperate with the Police, in order to swiftly and efficiently reveal all the electoral crimes and for the society to receive the actual picture and amount of the electoral violations.
 
On the abovementioned essential and other electoral violations the Human Rights Defender received 253 calls. Before presenting our comprehensive assessment on the elections we will continue receiving calls on the electoral violations during the election different stages, follow relevant publications of mass media, assessments of the observer organizations and post-electoral developments.

See also 

 Armenia in the Council of Europe
 Corruption in Armenia
 Government of Armenia
 Human rights in Armenia
 Social issues in Armenia
 Social protection in Armenia

References

External links 
 Human Rights Defender of Armenia
 RA law about Human Rights Defender 
 RA law about Human Rights Defender 

Human rights in Armenia
Armenia